Skrapar Sports Field is a purpose-built stadium in Çorovodë, Skrapar, Albania, and it is the current home of FK Skrapari.

References 

Football venues in Albania
Buildings and structures in Skrapar